This list of the prehistoric life of Louisiana contains the various prehistoric life-forms whose fossilized remains have been reported from within the US state of Louisiana.

Precambrian-Paleozoic
The Paleobiology Database records no known occurrences of Precambrian or Paleozoic fossils in Louisiana.

Mesozoic

 †Dufrenoyia
 †Dufrenoyia dufrenoyi – or unidentified related form
 †Dufrenoyia texana
 †Hypacanthoplites
 †Parahoplites – tentative report
 †Pseudosaynella
 †Rhytidhoplites
 †Rhytidhoplites robertsi
 Squalicorax
 †Squalicorax pristodontus

Cenozoic
This list of the Cenozoic life of Louisiana contains the various prehistoric life-forms whose fossilized remains have been reported from within the US state of Louisiana and are between 66 million and 10,000 years of age.

A

 †Abderospira
 †Abderospira leblanci
 †Abderospira oviformis
 †Abderospira stewarti
 †Abdounia
 †Abdounia enniskilleni
 Abra
 †Abra nitens
  Acanthocardia
 †Acanthocardia tuomeyi
 †Aciculiscala
 †Aciculiscala jacobi
  Acirsa
 †Acirsa whitneyi
 Aclis – report made of unidentified related form or using admittedly obsolete nomenclature
 †Aclis modesta
 Acteon
 †Acteon annectens
 †Acteon idoneus
 †Acteon pomilius
 Actinocythereis
 †Actinocythereis rosefieldensis
 †Adeorbis
 †Adeorbis sylvaerupis – or unidentified comparable form
 Adrana
 †Adrana aldrichiana
  †Aepycamelus
 †Aesculiidites
 †Aesculiidites circumstriatus
  Aetobatus
 Agaronia
 †Agaronia media
 †Agaronia mississippiensis
 †Alatocythereis – tentative report
 Albula
 †Allomorone
 †Alnipollenites
 †Alnipollenites trina
 †Alnipollenites verus
  Alopias
 †Alopias latidens
 †Alveinus
 †Alveinus minutus
 †Alveinus sinutus
  Ammospermophilus – tentative report
 †Ampullina
 †Ampullina alabamiensis
 Anadara
 †Anadara vaughani
 Ancilla
 †Ancilla staminea
 Angulogerina
 †Angulogerina byramensis
 †Anisonchus
 †Anisonchus fortunatus – type locality for species
 Anomalinoides
 †Anomalinoides danvillensis
 Anomia
 †Anomia hammetti
 †Anomia lisbonensis
 †Anomia rufa
 Antalis
 †Antalis danvillense
 †Antalis minutistriatum
 †Antalis mississippiense
  Antrozous
  †Aphelops
 Aplodinotus
 †Aplodinotus distortus
 †Aplodinotus gemma
  Architectonica
 †Architectonica acuta
 †Architectonica alveatum
 †Architectonica amoena
 †Architectonica bellense
 †Architectonica bellistriata
 †Architectonica meekana
 †Architectonica ornata
 Arcopagia
 †Arcopagia eburneopsis
 †Arcopagia raveneli
 Arcoscalpellum
 †Arcoscalpellum jacksonensis
 †Arecipites
  Ariosoma
 Arius
 Articulina
 †Articulina byramensis
 Asterigerina
 †Asterigerina subacuta
 Asthenotoma
 †Asthenotoma danvitexa
 †Asthenotoma eximia
 †Asthenotoma strigosa
 Astrangia
 †Astrangia expansa
 †Astrangia ludoviciana – type locality for species
  Athleta
 †Athleta clayi
 †Athleta haleanus
 †Athleta petrosa
 †Athleta symmetricus
 †Athleta wheelockensis
 Atrina
 †Atrina gardnerae
 †Atrina gravida
 †Atrina jacksoniana
  †Aturia
 †Aturia garretti
 †Aturia laticlavia
 Atys
 †Atys robustoides – or unidentified comparable form
 †Atys salina

B

  Balanophyllia
 †Balanophyllia caulifera
 †Balanophyllia irrorata
 Balcis
 Barbatia
 †Barbatia cuculloides
 †Barbatia ludoviciana
  †Basilosaurus – type locality for genus
 †Basilosaurus cetoides – type locality for species
 †Basopollis
 †Basopollis obscurocostatus
  Bassariscus
 Bathytoma
 †Bathytoma nonplicata
 Bathytormus
 †Bathytormus clarkensis
 †Bathytormus flexurus
 †Batrachosauroides
  Belone
 †Belosaepia
 †Belosaepia uncinata
 †Belosaepia veatchi
 †Bifarina
 †Bifarina vicksburgensis
  Bittium
 †Bittium koeneni
 †Bitubulogerina
 †Bitubulogerina vicksburgensis
 Bolivina
 †Bolivina alazanensis
 †Bolivina beyrichi
 †Bolivina byramensis
 †Bolivina choctawensis
 †Bolivina cookei
 †Bolivina costifera
 †Bolivina gracilis
 †Bolivina jacksonensis
 Bolivinella
 †Bolivinella subpectinata
 †Bolivinella vicksburgensis
 †Bombacacidites
 †Bonellitia
 †Bonellitia jacksonica
 †Bootherium
  †Bootherium bombifrons
 Brachidontes
 †Brachidontes alabamensis
 †Brachidontes stubbsi
 †Brachidontes texanus
 †Brachyerix
 †Brachyerix incertis – or unidentified comparable form
 †Brachysporites
  Bregmaceros
 †Bregmaceros troelli
 †Bregmoceras
 †Bristocorbula
 †Bristocorbula fossata
 †Brychaetus
 Buccella
 †Buccella vicksburgensis
 Bulimina
 †Bulimina ovata
 Buliminella
 †Buliminella nuda
  Bullia
 †Bullia ellipticum
 †Bullinella
 Buntonia
 †Buntonia huneri

C

 Cadulus
 †Cadulus abruptus
 †Cadulus jacksonensis
 †Cadulus margarita
 †Cadulus ouachitensis
 †Cadulus subcoarcuatus
 Caestocorbula
 †Caestocorbula fossata
 †Caestocorbula wailesiana
 †Caestocorbula wailsiana
 †Calamuspollenites
 †Calapa
 Callista
 †Callista annexa
 †Callista pearlensis
 †Callista perovata
 †Calorhadia
 †Calorhadia aldrichiana
 †Calorhadia bella
 †Calorhadia equalis
 †Calorhadia opulenta
 †Calorhadia reginajacksonis
 †Calorhadia semen
  Calyptraea
 †Calyptraea alta
 †Calyptraphorus
 †Calyptraphorus aldrichi
 †Calyptraphorus stamineus
 †Calyptraphorus trinodiferus
 †Calyptraphorus velatus
  Capulus
 †Capulus americanus
  Carcharhinus
 †Carcharhinus gibbesi
 †Carcharochles
 †Carcharochles auriculatus
 Cardium
  Caretta
 †Caricella
 †Caricella demissa
 †Caricella howei
 †Caricella ludoviciana
 †Caricella polita
 †Caricella stenzeli
 †Caricella subangulata
 †Caricella turneri
 †Caryapollenites
 †Caryapollenites prodromus-imparalis type
 †Caryapollenites simplex
 Caryocorbula
 †Caryocorbula densata
 †Caryocorbula deusseni
 †Caryocorbula willistoni
  Caryophyllia
 †Caryophyllia dalli – type locality for species
 †Casurinidites
 †Casurinidites pulcher
 †Cedripites
 Celleporaria
 †Celleporaria granulosa
 †Centalium
 †Centroberys
  Centroberyx
  Centropristis
 †Cercidiphyllites
  Cerithiella
 †Cerithiella jacksonensis
 †Cerithiella ouachitensis
 Chama
 †Chenopodipollis
 †Chiloguembelina
 †Chiloguembelina cubensis
 †Chilogumbelina
 †Chilogumbelina cubensis
 Chiton
 Chlamys
 †Chlamys danvillensis
 †Chlamys nupera
 †Chlamys wahtubbeana
 Chrysalogonium
 †Chrysalogonium vicksburgense
  Cibicides
 †Cibicides americanus
 †Cibicides choctawensis
 †Cibicides lobatulus
 †Cibicides mississippiensis
 †Cibicides pseudoungerianus
 †Cibicides sassei
 †Cicatricosisporites
 †Cicatricosisporites dorogensis
 Cirsotrema
 †Cirsotrema danvillense
 †Cirsotrema nassulum
 †Cirsotrema ranellinum
  Citharichthys
  Clavilithes
 †Clavilithes humerosus
 †Clavilithes kennedyanus
 †Clavilithes penrosei
 †Clavilithes regexus
 †Clavilithes texanus
 Closia
 †Closia larvata
 †Closia semen
 †Closia semenoides
  Cochlespira
 †Cochlespira bella
 †Cochlespira columbaria
 †Cochlespira terebralis
 †Cochlespirella
 †Cochlespirella nana
 †Cocoaia
 Columbellopsis
 †Columbellopsis mississippiensis
 Cominella – or unidentified comparable form
 †Cominella pachecoi
  Conger
 †Conger dissimilis
 †Conger fornicatus
 †Congeris
 †Congeris brevior
 Conomitra
 †Conomitra fusoides
 †Conomitra hammakeri
 †Conomitra jacksonensis
 †Conomitra texana
 Conopeum
 †Conorbis
 †Conorbis alatoideus
  Conus
 †Conus alleni – type locality for species
 †Conus sauridens
 †Converrucosisporites
 †Copemys
 †Coptostoma
 †Coptostoma ulmulum
 Coralliophila
 †Coralliophila aldrichi
  Corbula
 †Corbula cappa
 Cordieria
 †Cordieria ludoviciana
  †Cormohipparion
 †Cormohipparion goorisi – or unidentified comparable form
 †Cornulina
 †Cornulina dalli
 †Cornulina minax
 †Cornulina triseralis
 Cornuspira
 †Cornuspira byramensis
 †Coronia
 †Coronia childreni
 †Coronia conjuncta
 †Coronia coraliger
 †Coronia genitiva
 †Coronia lerchi
 †Coronia ludonorma
 †Coronia margaritosa
 †Coronia montgomeryensis
 †Coronia nodulina
 †Coronia nucleata
 †Coronia obsolescens
 †Coronia parvidens
 †Coronia plentopsis
 †Coronia wateletella
 †Coronia weisbordi
 Crassatella
 †Crassatella negreetensis
 †Crassatella texalta
 †Crassatella trapaquara
 Crassinella
 †Crassinella pygmaea
 Crepidula
 †Crepidula lirata
  †Cretolamna
 †Cretolamna lerichei
  Crocodylus
 †Cubitostrea
 †Cubitostrea divaricata
 †Cubitostrea lisbonensis
 †Cubitostrea sellaeformis
 †Cupanieidites
 †Cupuliferoipollenites
 Cuspidaria
 †Cuspidaria multiornata
 †Cyathedites
 †Cybium
  Cyclammina
 †Cyclammina caneriverensis
 Cylichnella
 †Cylichnella bitruncata
 †Cylindracanthus
 †Cylindracanthus rectus
  Cymatosyrinx
 †Cymatosyrinx dorseyi
 †Cymatosyrinx palmerae
 †Cynarctus
 Cypraedia
 †Cypraedia fenestralis
 †Cypraeorbis
 †Cypraeorbis ventripotens
 Cytherella
 Cytherelloidea
 †Cytherelloidea byramensis
 †Cytherelloidea chawneri
 Cytheromorpha
 †Cytheromorpha rosefieldensis

D

  Dasyatis
 †Dasyostoma
 †Dasyostoma rugostoma
 †Deltoidospora
  Dendrophyllia
 †Dendrophyllia lisbonensis
 †Dendrophyllia striata – type locality for species
 Dentalina
 †Dentalina emaciata
 †Dentalina filiformis
 †Dentalina hantkeni
 †Dentalina monroei
 †Dentalina praecatesbyi
 †Dentalina pseudoinvolons
 Dentalium
 †Dentalium jacksonense
 †Dentalium microstria
 †Dentalium minutistriatum
 †Dentalium mississippiense
 †Dicellaesporites
 †Dicellaesporites popovii
 †Dicorbitura
 †Dicorbitura dignata
 †Digmocyhere
  Diodon
  Diodora
 †Diodora alabama
 †Diodora tenebrosa
 Diplodonta
 †Diplodonta anterproductus
 †Diplodonta bulla
 †Diplodonta inflata
 †Diporicellaesporites
 †Diporicellaesporites psilatus
 †Diporicellaesporites reticulatus
 †Diporisporites
 †Diporisporites type 2 informal
 †Discocyclina
 †Discocyclina advena
 Discorbis
 †Discorbis subaraucana
 †Discotrochus
 †Discotrochus orbignianus
  Distorsio
 †Divisisporites
 †Divisisporites enormis
 †Dolicholatirus
 †Dolicholatirus leaensis
 †Dontogryphaea
 †Dontogryphaea thirsae
  Dorsanum
 †Dorsanum scalatum
 †Dyadosporonites
 †Dyadosporonites schwabii
 †Dyseohyus

E

 †Eburneopecten
 †Eburneopecten corneoides
 †Eburneopecten scintillatus
 Echinocythereis
 †Echinocythereis mcguirti
 †Ectinochilus
 †Ectinochilus stenzeli
 †Edaphocyon – tentative report
 †Ekokenia
  Elphidium
 †Elphidium latispatium
 Endopachys
 †Endopachys lonsdalei
 †Endopachys maclurii
 Entosolenia
 †Entosolenia orbignyana
 †Eocithara
 †Eocithara jacksonensis
 †Eoclathurella
 †Eoclathurella jacksonica
 †Eoclathurella obesula
 †Eodrilla
 †Eodrilla lonsdalei
 †Eodrilla lonsdallii
 †Eodrillia
 †Eodrillia texana
 Eoeponidella
 †Eoeponidella meyerhoffi
 †Eophysema
 †Eophysema ozarkana
 †Eopleurotoma
 †Eopleurotoma carya
 †Eopleurotoma gemmaria
 †Eopleurotoma ouachitensis
 †Eopleurotoma plumbella
 †Eopleurotoma sabinaria
 †Eosurcula
 †Eosurcula moorei
 †Eosurcula sanctimauritii
 †Ephedripites
 †Ephedripites voluta
 Epistominella
 †Epistominella danvillensis
  Epitonium
 †Epitonium kingae
 †Epitonium multiliniferum
 †Epitonium unilineata
 Eponides
 †Eponides byramensis
 Equus
 †Equus complicatus
 †Equus fraternus
 †Equus intermedius – type locality for species
 †Ericipites
 †Eucheilodon
 †Eucheilodon crenocarinata
  Eumeces
 Eurytellina
 †Eurytellina linifera
 †Euscalpellum
 †Euscalpellum eocenense
  Euspira
 †Euspira jacksonensis
 †Expressipollis
 †Extratriporopollenites

F

 Falsifusus
 †Falsifusus bastropensis
 †Falsifusus harrisi
 †Falsifusus ludlovicianus
 †Favitricolporites
 †Favitricolporites baculoferous
 †Ficopsis
 †Ficopsis penita
 †Ficopsis texana
  Ficus
 †Ficus filia
 †Ficus merita
  Fissurella
 †Fissurella alabama
 Flabellum
 †Flabellum cuneifome
 †Flabellum cuneiforme
 †Flabellum lerchi – type locality for species
 †Flabellum wailesii
 †Frizzellithus
 †Frizzellithus gemma
 Fursenkoina
 †Fursenkoina punctata
 †Fusiformisporites
 †Fusiformisporites crabbii
 Fusimitra
 †Fusimitra millingtoni
  Fusinus
 †Fusinus insectoides
 †Fusitoma
 †Fusitoma sipha
 Fustiaria
 †Fustiaria danai

G

  Galeocerdo
 †Galeocerdo alabamensis
 †Galeocerdo clarkensis
 †Galeocerdo contortus
 Galeodea
 †Galeodea koureos
 †Galeodea planotecta
 Galeorhinus
 †Galeorhinus huberensis
 Gari
 †Gari jacksonensis
 Gegania
 †Gegania antiquata
 Genota
 †Genota heilprini
  †Gigantostrea
 †Gigantostrea trigonalis
  Ginglymostoma
 †Ginglymostoma serra
 †Gleicheniidites
  Globigerina
 †Globigerina ouachitaensis
 Globobulimina
 †Globobulimina pyrula
 Globorotalia
 †Globorotalia centralis
 †Globorotalia cerroazulensis
 Globulina
 †Globulina gibba
 Glycymeris
 †Glycymeris filosa
 †Glycymeris idonea
 †Glycymeris trigonella
 Glyptoactis
 †Glyptoactis alticostata – or unidentified comparable form
 †Glyptoactis complexicosta
 †Glyptoactis trapaquara
  †Glyptotherium
 †Glyptotherium floridanum – or unidentified comparable form
 †Glyptotoma
 †Glyptotoma crassiplicata
 †Glyptotoma fisherana
 Gnathophis
 †Gnathophis dissimilis
  †Gomphotherium
 Guttulina
 †Guttulina austriaca
 †Guttulina byramensis
 Gyroidina
 †Gyroidina danvillensis
 †Gyroidina vicksburgensis
 Gyroidinoides
 †Gyroidinoides danvillensis

H

 †Haimesiastraea
 †Haimesiastraea conferta
 †Hamulatisporites
 †Hamulatisporites amplus
 Hanzawaia
 †Hanzawaia mauricensis
  Hastula
 †Hastula houstonia
 Haustator
 †Haustator carinata
 †Haustator perdita
 †Haustator rina
 Hemipristis
 †Hemipristis curvatus
 †Hemipristis wyattdurhami
 Hemisinus
 †Hemisinus jacksonius
 †Hemisurcula
 †Hemisurcula silicata
  Heterodontus
 †Heterodontus pineti
 Heterostegina
 Hexaplex
 †Hexaplex katherinae
 †Hexaplex marksi
 †Hexaplex silvaticus
 †Hexaplex supernus
 †Hilgardia
 †Hilgardia multilineata
 Hipponix
 †Hipponix pygmaea
 †Hipponix pygmaeus
 †Homomya
 †Homomya hamatoides
 Hoplopteron
 †Hoplopteron elegans
  †Hypolagus – or unidentified comparable form
  †Hypoxylon

I

 †Ilexpollenites
 †Inapertisporites
 †Inaperturopollenites
 †Infracoronia
 †Infracoronia ludoviciana
 †Involutisporites
 †Involutisporonites
  Isurus
 †Isurus praecursor

J

 †Jefitchia
 †Jefitchia claybornensis
 †Jonus
 †Jonus tortilis
 Jugosocythereis

K

 †Kapalmerella
 †Kapalmerella alveata
 †Kapalmerella arenicola
 †Kapalmerella mortoni
 †Kapalmerella pleboides
 Kelliella
 †Kelliella boettgeri
 †Kyandopollenites
 †Kyandopollenites anneratus

L

 †Lacrimasporonites
 †Lacrimasporonites basidii
  Lactarius
 †Laevigatosporites
 Lagena
 †Lagena hexagona
 Lamarckina
 †Lamarckina byramensis
 †Lamarckina claibornse
  Lamna
 †Lamna lerichi
 †Lapparia
 †Lapparia cancellata
 †Lapparia dumosa
 †Lapparia mooreana
  Latirus
 †Latirus humilior
 †Latirus moorei
 †Latirus tortillis
 †Leiotriletes
 Lenticulina
 †Lenticulina catahoulaensis
 †Lenticulina cultrata
 †Lenticulina danvillensis
 †Lenticulina rotulata
 †Lenticulina vicksburgensis
 †Lepidocyclina
 †Lepidocyclina supera
 †Levifusus
 †Levifusus branneri
 †Levifusus fulguriparens
 †Levifusus identus
 †Levifusus mortoniopsis
 †Levifusus pagodiformis
 †Levifusus prepagoda
 †Levifusus supraplanus
 †Levifusus trabeatus
 †Liliacidites
 Lima
 †Limnoecus
 †Limnoecus niobrarensis
 Limopsis
 †Limopsis aviculoides
 †Limopsis radiata
 †Linthia
 †Linthia hollandi – type locality for species
 †Liquidambarpollenites
 †Lirodiscus
 †Lirodiscus jacksonensis
 †Lirodiscus pretriangulata
 †Lirodiscus smithvillensis
 †Lirofusus
 †Lirofusus thoracicus
 †Lithophysema
 †Lithophysema grande
 †Litorhadia
 †Litorhadia albirupina – tentative report
 †Litorhadia compsa
 †Litorhadia mater
 Loxoconcha
 †Loxoconcha woodwordensis
 Lucina
 †Lucina atoma
 †Lucina perminuta
 Lunulites
 †Lunulites bassleri
 †Lusatisporites
 †Lycopodiumsporites
 †Lyrosurcula
 †Lyrosurcula acuta
 †Lyrosurcula columbiana
 †Lyrosurcula dalli
 †Lyrosurcula elegans
 †Lyrosurcula obsoleta
 †Lyrosurcula shaleri

M

 Macrocallista
 Madracis
 †Madracis ganei – type locality for species
 †Madracis gregorioi
  Madrepora
 †Madrepora natchitochensis – type locality for species
  †Mammut
 †Margaritaria
 †Margaritaria inexpectens
  Marginella
 †Marginella constrictoides
 Marginulina
 †Marginulina variata
 Marginulinopsis
 †Marginulinopsis fragaria
 †Margocolporites
 †Margocolporites kruschii
 Martesia
 Massilina
 †Massilina pratti
 †Mauricia
 †Mauricia houstonia
 †Mazzalina
 †Mazzalina plena
  Melanella
 †Melanella jacksonensis
 †Melanella wheeleri
 Melonis
 †Melonis planatum
 Meretrix
 †Meretrix nuttalliopsis
 †Meretrix nuttelliopsis
  †Merychippus
 †Merychippus gunteri
  †Merychyus
 Mesalia
 †Mesalia claibornensis
 †Mesalia vetusta
 Metula
 †Metula johnsoni
 †Metula subgracilis
 †Michela
 †Michela trabeatoides
 Microdrillia
 †Microdrillia minutissima
 †Microdrillia ouachitae
 †Microdrillia robustula
 †Microfoveolatosporis
 †Microfoveolatosporis pseudodentatus
 †Microfoveolatosporites
 †Microreticulatisporites
 Miltha
 †Miltha gaufia
 †Miomustela
 Mitrella
 †Mitrella alabamensis
 †Mitrella casteri
 †Mitrella parva
 Mnestia
 †Mnestia dekayi
 †Mnestia meyeri
 Modiolus
 †Momipites
 †Monoporisporites
 †Monoptygma
 †Monoptygma crassiplicum
 †Morozovella
 †Morozovella aragonensis
 †Multicellaesporites
 Myliobatis
  †Mylodon
 †Mylodon harlanii
 †Myripistis
  Myripristis
 Myrtea
 †Myrtea curta

N

 †Nannipus
  Nassarius
 †Nassarius albirupina
 †Nassarius exilis
 †Nassarius hilli
 †Nassarius jacksonensis
 †Nassarius magnocostata
 †Natchitochia – type locality for genus
 †Natchitochia jonesi – type locality for species
  Natica
 †Natica aperta
 †Natica permunda
  Naticarius – or unidentified comparable form
 †Naticarius semilunata
 Nemocardium
 †Nemocardium gambrinum
 †Nemocardium nicoletti
 †Nemocardium nicolletti
 †Nemocardium salrivale
 †Neobythitinarum – report made of unidentified related form or using admittedly obsolete nomenclature
 †Neobythitinarum meyeri
 †Neobythitinorum – report made of unidentified related form or using admittedly obsolete nomenclature
 †Neobythitinorum meyeri
 †Neoepenoides
 †Neoepenoides antillarum
 †Neozanthopsis
 †Neozanthopsis americana
  Neverita
 †Neverita limula
  Niso
 Nodosaria
 †Nodosaria pyrula
 †Nodosaria vertebralis
 Nonion
 †Nonion advenum
 †Nonion alabamense
 †Nonion decoratum
 Nonionella
 †Nonionella hantkeni
 †Nonionella jacksonensis
 †Nonionella tatumi
 †Nototamias
  Nucula
 †Nucula magnifica
 †Nucula mauricensis
 †Nucula ovula
 †Nucula smithvillensis – or unidentified comparable form
 †Nucula sphenopsis
 †Nucula yazooensis
 Nuculana
 †Nuculana corpulentoidea
 †Nuculana fiski – type locality for species
 †Nuculana magna
 †Nuculana ovula
 †Nuculana wautubbeana
 †Nudopollis
 †Nudopollis terminalis
 †Nudopollis theirgartii – or unidentified related form

O

  Odontaspis
 †Odontaspis hopei
 †Odontogryphaea
 †Odontogryphaea thirsae
 †Odontopolys
 †Odontopolys compsorhytis
 Odostomia
 †Odostomia trapaquara
  Operculina
 †Ophichthyidarum – report made of unidentified related form or using admittedly obsolete nomenclature
 †Ophichthyidarum brevior
 Orthopristis
 †Orthosurcula
 †Orthosurcula adeona – or unidentified related form
 †Orthosurcula indenta
 †Orthosurcula longipersa
 †Orthosurcula persa
 Orthoyoldia
 †Orthoyoldia kindlei
 †Orthoyoldia psammotaea
 †Osmundacidites
  †Ostracion
 †Ostracion meretrix
 Ostrea
 †Ostrea compressirostra – or unidentified comparable form
 †Ostrea crenulimarginata
 †Ostrea falco
 †Ostrea multilirata
 †Ostrea sylvaerupis
 Otionella
 †Ovoidites

P

 †Pachecoa
 †Pachecoa decisa
 †Pachecoa ellipsis
 †Pachecoa pulchra
  †Palmoxylon
 †Palmoxylon cellulosum
 †Palmoxylon quenstedi
 †Papillina
 †Papillina dumosa
 Paraconger
 Paracyathus
 †Paracyathus alternatus – type locality for species
 †Paracyathus bellus
 Paracypris
 †Paracypris rosefieldensis
  †Paramylodon
 †Paramylodon harlani – type locality for species
 Parasmilia
 †Parasmilia ludoviciana – type locality for species
 †Parcypris
 Parvilucina
 †Parvilucina sabelli
 †Patulaxis
 †Patulaxis scrobiculata
 Pecten
 †Pecten perplanus
  †Pediastrum
  Penion
 †Penion penrosei
 Periploma
 †Periploma claibornense
 †Periploma collardi
 †Periploma howei – type locality for species
 †Perotriletes
 †Pesavis
 †Pesavis tagulensis
 †Petauristodon
 Petrophyllia
 †Petrophyllia vernonensis – type locality for species
 †Petrophyllia vicksburgensis
  Phalium
 †Phalium brevicostatum
 †Phalium taitii
 Pholadomya
 †Pholadomya harrisi
 Phos
 †Phos sagenum
 †Phos texanum
 Picea
 †Picea critchfieldii
 †Piceapollenites
 †Pilicatula
 †Pilicatula filamentosa
 Pinna
 †Pinna gardnerae
 †Pinuspollenites
 †Pistillipollenites
 †Pistillipollenites mcgregorii
  Pitar
 †Pitar securiformis
 †Pitar trigoniata
 †Plagiarca
 †Plagiarca rhomboidella
 †Plagiarca vaughani
 Plagiocardium
 Planorbulina
 †Planorbulina mediterranensis
 Planularia
 Planulina
 †Planulina ouachitaensis
 †Platycaryapollenites
 †Platycaryapollenites platycaryoides
 †Platyoptera
 †Platyoptera extenta
 Platytrochus – type locality for genus
 †Platytrochus elegans – type locality for species
 †Pleuricellaesporites
 Pleurofusia
 †Pleurofusia danvicola
 †Pleurofusia evanescens
 †Pleurofusia fluctuosa
 †Pleurofusia huppertzi
 †Pleurofusia subservata
 †Pleuroliria
 †Pleuroliria crenulosa
 †Pleuroliria jacksonella
 †Pleuroliria simplex
 Pleuromeris
 †Pleuromeris inflatior
 †Pleuromeris inflator
 Pleurotomella
 †Pleurotomella veatchi
 Plicatula
 †Plicatula filamentosa
 †Plicatula louisiana
  Podocarpus
  Polinices
 †Polinices aratus
 †Polinices harrisii
 †Polinices julianna
 †Polinices weisbordi
 †Pollinices
 †Pollinices harrisii
 †Polycolporopollenites
 Polymorphina
 †Polymorphina advena
  †Polypodium
 Polyschides
 †Polyschides margarita
 Pontocythere
 †Pontogeneus – type locality for genus
 †Pontogeneus priscus – type locality for species
 †Porocolpopollenites
 Poromya
 †Poromya mississippiensis
 †Porticulasphaera
 †Porticulasphaera index
 †Preophidion
 †Preophidion meyeri
 †Priscoficus
 †Priscoficus juvenis
  Pristigenys
 †Pristigenys obliquus
  Pristipomoides
  Pristis
 †Pristis lathami
 †Projenneria
 †Projenneria ludoviciana – type locality for species
  Propeamussium
 †Propeamussium squamulum – or unidentified comparable form
 †Propristis
 †Propristis schweinfurthi
 †Prosynthetoceras
 †Prosynthetoceras francisi
 †Proteacidites
 †Protosurcula
 †Protosurcula gabbii
 †Pseudohastigerina
 †Pseudohastigerina micra
  †Pseudolatirus
 †Pseudolatirus tortilis
 Pseudoliva
 †Pseudoliva santander
 †Pseudoliva vetusta
 Pseudoneptunea – or unidentified comparable form
 †Pseudoneptunea harrisi
 Pseudononion
 †Pseudononion spissus
 †Pseudoparablastomeryx
 Pseudophichthys
 †Pseudoplicapollis
 Pteria
 †Pteria limula
 †Pterocaryapollenites
 †Pteropsella
 †Pteropsella lapidosa
 †Pterosphenus
 †Pterosphenus schucherti
  Pterynotus
 †Pterynotus sabinola
 †Pterynotus weisbordi – type locality for species
  Pycnodonte
 †Pycnodonte ludoviciana
 †Pycnodonte sylvaerupis
 †Pycnodonte trigonalis
 †Pycnodonte vicksburgensis
  Pyramidella
 †Pyramidella lapinaria
 †Pyramidella meyeri
 †Pyramidella perexilis
 †Pyramimitra
 †Pyramimitra terebraeformis
 Pythonichthys – or unidentified comparable form

Q

 †Quadrapollenites
 †Quercoidites
  Quinqueloculina
 †Quinqueloculina cookei
 †Quinqueloculina vicksburgensis

R

 Raphitoma
 †Raphitoma nucleola
  Retusa
 †Retusa adamsi
 †Retusa galba
 †Retusa jacksonensis
 †Retusa kellogii
 Reussella
 †Reussella byramensis
 †Reussella oligocenica
 †Rhabdopitaria
 †Rhabdopitaria winnensis
  Rhinoptera
  Rhizoprionodon
 Rhizorus – or unidentified comparable form
 †Rhizorus minutissimus
 †Rhizorus wellsi
  Rhynchoconger
 Rimella
 †Rimella texanum
 †Ringicardium
 †Ringicardium harrisi
 Ringicula
 †Ringicula butleriana
 †Ringicula trapaquara
 †Rotalia
 †Rotalia byramensis
 †Rudiscala
 †Rudiscala harrisi

S

 Saracenaria
 †Saracenaria moresiana
 Sassia
 †Sassia jacksonensis
 †Sassia septemdentata
  Scaphella – or unidentified comparable form
 †Scaphella newcombiana
 Schizaster
 †Schizaster armiger
 †Schizosporis
 †Schizosporis paleocenicus
 Sciaena
 †Sciaena psuedoradians
  †Sciaena umbra
 †Sciaenidarium
 †Sciaenidarium claybornensis
 Scobinella
 †Scobinella famelica
 †Scobinella hammettensis
 †Scobinella louisianae
 †Scobinella newtonensis
 †Scobinella transitionalis
 †Sequoidendron
 Serpulorbis
 †Serpulorbis chavani
 Sigmomorphina
 †Sigmomorphina jacksonensis
 †Sigmomorphina pulchra
 †Sigmomorphina semitecta
 †Sigmopollis
  Simnia
 †Simnia subtruncata
 †Sinistrella
 †Sinistrella americana
  Sinum
 †Sinum danvillense
 †Sinum fiski – type locality for species
 †Sinum jacksonense
  Siphonalia
 †Siphonalia sullivani
 Siphonina
 †Siphonina advena
 †Siphonina jacksonensis
 Sirembo – or unidentified related form
 †Skenae
 †Skenae pignus
 Solariella
 †Solariella tricostata
 Solariorbis
 †Solariorbis subangulatus
 Solen
 †Solen pendletonensis – type locality for species
 †Sparidarum – report made of unidentified related form or using admittedly obsolete nomenclature
 †Sphaerocypraea
 †Sphaerocypraea jacksonensis
  Sphyraena
 †Sphyraena major
 †Spinaepollis
 †Spinaepollis spinosus
 Spirillina
 †Spirillina vicksburgensis
 Spiroloculina
 Spiroplectammina
 †Spiroplectammina howei
 †Spiroplectammina mississippiensis
 †Spirotextularia
 †Spirotextularia mississippiensis
  Spisula
 †Spisula jacksonensis
 †Spisula parilis
 †Spisula praetenuis – or unidentified comparable form
  Spondylus
 †Sterisporites
 †Sterisporites bimammatus
 †Sterisporites buchenauensis
 †Sterisporites bujargensis
 †Sterisporites steroides
 †Sulcocypraea
 †Sulcocypraea healeyi
 †Sulcocypraea vaughani
 †Sullivania
 †Sullivania fisherensis
 †Surculoma
 †Surculoma falsabenes
 †Surculoma kellogii
 †Surculoma sabinicola
 †Surculoma stantoni
 Sveltella
 †Sveltella parva

T

  Taxodium
 Teinostoma
 †Teinostoma barryi
  †Teleoceras
 Tellina
 †Tellina bellsiana
 †Tellina estellensis
 †Tellina vicksburgensis
  Tenagodus
 †Tenagodus vitis
 Terebra
 †Terebra abditiva
 †Terebra jacksonensis
 †Terebra texagyra
 †Terebrifusus – tentative report
 Teredo
 †Teredo mississippiensis
 †Tetraporina
 †Texomys
 †Texomys ritchiei
 †Textualaria
 †Textualaria tumidula
  Textularia
 †Textularia dibollensis
 †Thompsonipollis
 †Thompsonipollis magnificus
 †Tiburnus
 †Tiburnus eboreus
 †Tiliaepollenites
  Trachycardium
 †Trachycardium ouachitense
 †Triagnulocypris
 †Triagnulocypris gibsonensis – tentative report
  Trichiurus
 †Trichiurus sagittidens
 †Tricolpites
 †Tricolpites hians
 †Tricolpopollenites
 †Tricolpopollenites geranoides
 †Tricolporopollenites
 Trigonostoma
 †Trigonostoma babylonicum
 †Trigonostoma panones
 †Trigonostoma selectum
 Trigonulina
 †Trigonulina satex
 Triloculina
 †Triloculina byramensis
 †Triloculina sculptura
 †Trinacria
 †Trinacria microcancellata – or unidentified comparable form
 †Triplanosporites
 †Triporopollenites
 †Triporopollenites bituitus
 †Tritonatractus
 †Tritonatractus pearlensis
 †Tritonidea
 †Tritonidea pachecoi
 Trochita
 †Trochita aperta
 Trochocyathus
 †Trochocyathus montgomeriensis
 †Tropisurcula
 †Tropisurcula crenula
 †Trudopollis
 †Truncorotaloides
 †Truncorotaloides danvillensis
 †Trypanotoma
 †Trypanotoma obtusa
 †Trypanotoma terebriformis
 †Turbinolia
 †Turbinolia pharetra
 †Turbinolia subtercisa
 †Turbinolia tenuis
 †Turbinolia vicksburgensis
  Turbonilla
 †Turbonilla major – tentative report
 Turricula
 †Turricula nasuto
 †Turricula plenta
 †Turricula plutonica
 †Turrilina
 †Turrilina robertsi
  Turris
 †Turris capax
 †Turris kerenensis
 †Turris rockscreekensis
 †Turris siphus
  Turritella
 †Turritella aldrichi
 †Turritella bellifera
 †Turritella bunkerhillensis
 †Turritella clevelandia
 †Turritella creola
 †Turritella dutexata
 †Turritella eurynome
 †Turritella gardnerae – type locality for species
 †Turritella multilira
 †Turritella nasuta
 †Turritella praecincta
 †Tythonichthys – or unidentified comparable form

U

 †Ulmipollenites
 Umbraculum
 †Umbraculum planulatum
  Umbrina
 †Umbrina gemma – or unidentified related form
 †Undulatisporites
 Uroconger
 Uromitra
 †Uromitra grantensis
 Ursus
  †Ursus americanus
 Uvigerina
 †Uvigerina gardnerae
 †Uvigerina jacksonensis
 †Uvigerina vicksburgensis

V

 Vaginulina
  Vasum
 †Vasum humerosum
 Venericardia
 †Venericardia apodensata
 †Venericardia bashiplata
 †Venericardia carsonensis
 †Venericardia densata
 †Venericardia diversidentata
 †Venericardia gardnerae – type locality for species
 †Venericardia klimacodes
 †Venericardia natchitoches
 †Venericardia rotunda
 †Venericardia sabinensis – type locality for species
 †Verrucatosporites
 †Verrucatosporites prosecundus
 †Verrucatosporites spp,
 Verticordia
 †Verticordia cossmanni
 †Verticordia sotoensis
 †Virgulina
 †Virgulina vicksburgensis
 †Vokesula
 †Vokesula aldrichi
  Voluta
 †Voluta newcombiana
 †Volvaria
 †Volvaria reticulata

X

 Xenistius – or unidentified related form
  Xenophora
 †Xenophora reclusa
 †Xiphiorhynchus

Y

 Yoldia
 †Yoldia hammetti
 †Yoldia kindlei

Z

  †Zygorhiza
 †Zygorhiza kochii

References
 

Louisiana